Woodwell is a hamlet in the English county of Northamptonshire, about a mile west of the village of Woodford. It is at the end of a cul-de-sac lane.

References

External links

Hamlets in Northamptonshire
North Northamptonshire